The Laine Hills are a cluster of four mainly snow-covered hills that rise above the Dyer Plateau about  northwest of the Welch Mountains, in Palmer Land, Antarctica. They were mapped by the United States Geological Survey in 1974, and were named by the Advisory Committee on Antarctic Names for Daren Laine, a United States Antarctic Research Program biologist at Palmer Station in 1975.

References

External links

Hills of Palmer Land